TayNew Meal Date (Kinkan Kap Tay - Niw; lit. Eat Together with Tay and New) is a Thai web series of GMMTV hosted by Tawan Vihokratana (Tay) and Thitipoom Techaapaikhun (New), both lead actors of Dark Blue Kiss (2019), currently available for streaming on YouTube and LINE TV.

Each episode features different places and restaurants where Tay and New get to taste and review several food choices. The series premiered on 30 November 2018 and aired mostly every last day of the month. It aired its last episode on 26 December 2019.

On 27 May 2020, five months after the web series ended and amidst the COVID-19 pandemic, GMMTV released a special episode with the hosts doing a virtual food tour where they feature and review some food choices from several restaurants of their friends in GMMTV.

Episodes

Production 
Prior to its release, Thitipoom Techaapaikhun (New) revealed that the original title of the web series was "นิวหิว" where he goes to different restaurants and talk about their food offerings. While shooting the first episode, he felt that it was too bland that he needed someone to talk about the food's calories or ingredients. He then invited Tawan Vihokratana (Tay) to be his guest on the first episode's shooting and as soon as the editing was done, the producers decided to make it the pair's program with the title "กินกัน กับ เต - นิว".

References

External links 
 Youtube Playlist 
 GMMTV

2018 web series debuts
2019 web series endings
2010s YouTube series
Thai web series
GMMTV